Lieutenant Colonel James Harry Allason,  (6 September 1912 – 16 June 2011) was a British Conservative Party politician, sportsman, and former military planner who worked with Lord Mountbatten and Winston Churchill. At the time of his death, he was the oldest living former member of the House of Commons.

Military career
The son of Brigadier General Walter Allason by his wife Katherine Hamilton Poland, daughter of Vice Admiral James Augustus Poland, James Allason was raised primarily by a great-aunt following the death of his mother in 1913 protecting the infant James in a fall down stairs. Allason was a great-grandson of the architect Thomas Allason.

Allason was educated at Haileybury and Imperial Service College and the Royal Military Academy, Woolwich. He served as an officer in the British Army for 24 years from 1930 to 1954, including in India, Ceylon and Burma, rising to the rank of lieutenant colonel. He joined the Royal Artillery in 1932, transferring to the 3rd Carabiniers in 1937. A gifted mathematician, he addressed the problem of using magnetic compasses with tanks: the Allason Sun Compass was adopted for use throughout the Asian theatre.

Allason worked with the Supreme Allied Commander, Admiral Lord Louis Mountbatten, as joint planning staff officer in South East Asia Command and was wounded while commanding tanks during the Burma campaign. He subsequently occupied a similar post as senior military planner at the War Office in London, answering Winston Churchill's queries and providing briefings in the Cabinet War Rooms. His last planning task was to advise on the logistics of withdrawing from Palestine. From 1950 to 1954, he served at the War Office in charge of army discipline.

Political career
After leaving the army Allason worked as a Lloyd's of London insurance broker. He was elected a councillor on Kensington Borough Council in 1956.

Allason contested Hackney Central in 1955. He was Member of Parliament for Hemel Hempstead (after defeating Margaret Thatcher for the Conservative nomination) from 1959 to 1974, when, following boundary changes, he narrowly lost the seat in the October election of that year to Labour's Robin Corbett.

In government Allason was acknowledged for his expertise not only on defence but also in the arcane but key subject of pensions. When the Conservatives were in opposition, Allason was the front-bench spokesman on Housing for six years and is credited with development of the policy of enabling council house tenants to purchase their own properties. That was taken up by Margaret Thatcher and adopted by subsequent Conservative governments, contributing to their electoral victories. After leaving parliament he continued to exercise a rational influence on environmental policy from positions on the executive of the Town and Country Planning Association and the Environment Council's Transport Committee.

After the deaths of Patrick Maitland, 17th Earl of Lauderdale, in December 2008 and Bert Hazell in January 2009, Allason became the oldest living former British Member of Parliament.

Personal interests
As a sportsman Allason raced Bentleys at Brooklands, played polo with maharajahs in India, skied and sailed in international competition, and represented the House of Commons in five sports. He continued skiing until his 87th year, and continued to play Contract Bridge and attend the Opera, on which subjects he wrote.

In 1946, Allason married Nuala (who acted as Nuala McElveen and Nuala Barrie), daughter of John A. McArevey, of Foxrock, Dublin. They had two sons, the younger of whom, the Intelligence historian Rupert Allason, followed him into parliament as Member for Torbay. Julian (1948–2015), the elder son, was a photographer and travel-writer, as well as vice-president of the Anthony Powell Society. The marriage was dissolved in 1974. His wife continued to live at what had been their family home at 15 Cheyne Walk in Chelsea. Allason also lived at Pump Lane House, Bembridge, Isle of Wight.

Notes

References
Times Guide to the House of Commons, 1950, 1966 and October 1974

Ringside Seat, by James Allason, Timewell Press, London 2007

External links

Obituary in The Independent
Obituary in The Telegraph

1912 births
2011 deaths
Officers of the Order of the British Empire
Conservative Party (UK) MPs for English constituencies
Councillors in the Royal Borough of Kensington and Chelsea
Members of Kensington Metropolitan Borough Council
British Army personnel of World War II
Royal Artillery officers
3rd Carabiniers officers
People educated at Haileybury and Imperial Service College
Graduates of the Royal Military Academy, Woolwich
UK MPs 1959–1964
UK MPs 1964–1966
UK MPs 1966–1970
UK MPs 1970–1974
UK MPs 1974